Axymene aucklandicus is a species of predatory sea snail, a marine gastropod mollusc in the family Muricidae, the rock snails or murex snails.

References

 Suter, H. (1908a) Descriptions of new species of New Zealand marine shells. Proceedings of the Malacological Society of London, 8, 178–191, pl. 7
 Suter, H. (1909). The Mollusca of the Subantarctic islands of New Zealand. Pp 1–57 in Chilton, C. (ed.), The Subantarctic islands of New Zealand. Reports on the geo-physics, geology, zoology, and botany of the islands lying to the south of New Zealand, based mainly on observations and collections made during an expedition in the Government steamer “Hinemoa” (Captain J. Bollons) in November 1907. 1. Philosophical Institute of Canterbury, Wellington.
 Powell A W B, New Zealand Mollusca, William Collins Publishers Ltd, Auckland, New Zealand 1979 
 Beu, A.G. 2011 Marine Molluscs of oxygen isotope stages of the last 2 million years in New Zealand. Part 4. Gastropoda (Ptenoglossa, Neogastropoda, Heterobranchia). Journal of the Royal Society of New Zealand 41, 1–153.

External links
 Smith E.A. (1902). VII. Mollusca. Report on the collections of natural history made in the Antarctic regions during the voyage of the "Southern Cross": 201-213, pls 24-25
  Finlay H.J. (1926). A further commentary on New Zealand molluscan systematics. Transactions and Proceedings of the New Zealand Institute. 57: 320-485, pls 18-23
 Spencer H.G., Willan R.C., Marshall B.A. & Murray T.J. (2011). Checklist of the Recent Mollusca Recorded from the New Zealand Exclusive Economic Zone

Pagodulinae
Gastropods of New Zealand
Gastropods described in 1902